Allman may refer to:

Music
The Allman Brothers Band, Rock and Roll Hall of Fame southern rock band, formed by Duane and Gregg Allman
The Allman Joys, an early band formed by Duane and Gregg Allman
The Gregg Allman Band

People
Allman (surname)

Places
Allman, Indiana, a town in the US
William Allman Memorial Arena, an ice hockey arena in Stratford, Ontario, Canada

Science and technology
The Allman style, an indentation style

See also
Aleman (surname)
Alman (surname)